From March 9 to June 5, 1920, voters of the Republican Party elected delegates to the 1920 Republican National Convention for the purposing of choosing the party's nominee for president in the 1920 election. 

The delegates were largely contested between Governor Hiram Johnson of California, a progressive who had been the running mate of Theodore Roosevelt eight years prior; General Leonard Wood, one of Roosevelt's closest friends; and Frank O. Lowden, the Governor of Illinois.

After a series of primary elections and caucuses, no candidate had emerged with a clear majority of the delegates. At the 1920 Republican National Convention, held from June 8 to June 12, in Chicago, Illinois, the delegations of the leading candidates deadlocked and Warren G. Harding was nominated as a dark horse candidate, although he had only won a few delegates entering the convention.

Background

1912 and 1916 elections
In 1912, the Republican Party was split. Former President Theodore Roosevelt challenged incumbent William Howard Taft for the nomination and, when it was denied at the 1912 Republican National Convention, bolted to form the Progressive Party. With Republicans (who had won eight of the previous eleven presidential elections) split, Woodrow Wilson won the race with a plurality of the popular vote and a large majority in the electoral college.

In 1916, the Republican Party nominated Associate Justice of the United States Charles Evans Hughes, a respected jurist and former Governor of New York, as one who could appeal to both Progressives and Republicans alike. Though Hughes was able to avoid disaster when Roosevelt declined to run on the Progressive ticket, he fell narrowly short of defeating President Wilson, who significantly improved on his vote from 1912. The campaign was dominated by two wars: the Mexican Revolution and World War I. Responding to Republican calls for military preparedness, Wilson used the slogan "He kept us out of war" to emphasize the maintenance of U.S. neutrality.

World War I

In January 1917, the Zimmermann telegram from Germany to Mexico was intercepted by British intelligence. In the telegram, German diplomat Arthur Zimmermann offered to restore much of the territory Mexico had lost in the Mexican–American War in the event the United States entered the war. Zimmermann, hoping to threatening the United States, admitted the telegram's authenticity in a March speech to the Reichstag. Public outcry ensued, and Wilson requested a declaration of a "war to end all wars" against Germany. Congress granted the request on April 6, 1917, shortly after Wilson began his second term and nearly three years after the war had begun.

Major General Frederick Funston, Wilson's first choice to command U.S. forces, had died in February. Several Republican Party leaders called on Wilson to appoint Leonard Wood, a close friend and advisor of Theodore Roosevelt and long-time preparedness advocate. However, Wilson chose John J. Pershing, a Republican who had previously gained fame as commander of the Pancho Villa Expedition, at the behest of Secretary of War Newton D. Baker. After a yearlong mobilization effort, Pershing and U.S. troops began major combat operations during summer 1918, near the war's end. The United States was able to claim victory with relatively few casualties. Pershing's fame was further elevated to that of a war hero. He was widely considered a candidate for the presidency, though some Republicans considered him too close to the Wilson administration.

Wilson's Fourteen Points

On January 8, 1918, Wilson delivered a speech to Congress specifying his war aims. Those idealist aims, which came to be known as Wilson's Fourteen Points, sought to expand his progressive domestic program abroad. The Fourteen Points were to serve as the basis for negotiation of the Treaty of Versailles. Among the most controversial points were his proposals to remove economic barriers between nations, guarantee national self-determination, and establish a League of Nations, an international body designed to prevent future wars.

1918 midterm elections and death of Roosevelt

Criticism of the Fourteen Points as idealistic or an abrogation of national sovereignty was a major focus of the Republican campaign of 1918. The leading critic was former President Theodore Roosevelt, by now the early favorite for the 1920 presidential nomination. Though Roosevelt himself had privately predicted 1916 was his last campaign, his public profile remained strong and his attacks on Wilson made him a natural contender. In early March 1918, he declared, "By George, if they'll take me, they'll have to take me without a single modification of the things that I have always stood for!" He met with Republican strategists during the summer, though he declined to run for Governor of New York, privately citing the need to preserve his strength for the 1920 campaign.

With the war in its final week, Americans elected the Republican Party to control of both houses of Congress. In the state elections, Republicans performed well in the West, gaining five governors' offices west of the Mississippi River. Their major loss came in Roosevelt's home of New York, where Al Smith gained the governor's office.

Roosevelt's physical condition deteriorated rapidly after the his son Quentin was killed in action, and died at the age of sixty on January 6, 1919. His final written work, a criticism of the proposed League of Nations and defense of "Americanism," was published in Metropolitan Magazine shortly after his death. 

With Roosevelt dead, the leading candidates for the nomination were his friend, General Wood, and Senator Warren G. Harding of Ohio. On February 9, 1919, Wood delivered a memorial address for Roosevelt, in which he echoed the late President's criticisms of the League of Nations and raised his national profile as a political orator. "Either unconsciously or with a master hand," the Philadelphia Public Ledger reported, Wood had made a "bold and convincing bid for the Republican nomination." Wood soon replaced Roosevelt as a regular contributor to Metropolitan magazine and returned to command as head of the Army Central Department in Chicago.

Paris Peace Conference
Having lost command of Congress, Wilson left to personally represent the United States at the Paris Peace Conference in January 1919; he was the first President to leave for Europe while still in office. He brought with him only one Republican and chose, rather than a Senator or Representative, the ex-diplomat Henry White. Wilson's decision to double down on idealism and foreign intervention in the face of his rejection at the polls incensed Republican leadership (led by Henry Cabot Lodge), improved the party's political optimism for 1920, and promised to make foreign policy the defining issue of the upcoming campaign.

Labor and racial unrest

The success of the Bolshevik Revolution and the threat of revolution in Germany, Austria, and Italy bred hope and fear for revolution in the United States, where the Socialist Party had made modest gains. With Wilson in Europe and Roosevelt dead, the country was leaderless, as were both of its major political parties.

Labor strikes in 1919, especially in New York and Seattle, startled conservatives. Further strikes rocked the textile industry, the clothing trade, and street railcars. A Boston police strike skyrocketed Governor Calvin Coolidge to national prominence when, amid rioting and looting, he sternly declared there was no right "to strike against the public safety." Frank O. Lowden of Illinois also came to prominence for his handling of the Chicago race riot of 1919, facing off with mayor William Hale Thompson in a game of brinksmanship.

Leonard Wood made his personal contribution to the counterrevolution by leading his troops to West Virginia in April, where they headed off armed miners without violence. In September, Wood led troops to suppress a race riot in Omaha, brought on by the lynching of a black civilian. Again, he restored the peace without further bloodshed. His most controversial political act came in October, when he attempted to mediate the steel strike of 1919. The mediation ultimately failed, but Wood imposed terms on the strikers and capital with pleased neither. "I am now," he declared to Henry Stimson, "practically the Mayor of Omaha and Gary, with prospects of additions to the crop."

Pre-primary maneuvering
Between his domestic deployments in 1919, Wood traveled the country speaking on behalf of veterans' organizations. Everywhere, he was received as if he were already the Republican nominee. He hired John T. King, a former associate of Roosevelt's from Bridgeport, Connecticut, as a political manager. Others in the party's Old Guard, however, saw Wood as too independent and preferred Harding.

By November 1919, Wood's political-military campaign had been a rousing success. "Unless the situation changes," wrote William Allen White, "no other candidate will be mentioned in the Republican Convention. But the situation of course in this country will have to be desperate if it does not change." As the popular front-runner, Wood was vulnerable both from fatigue and the attention of other candidates, led first by Harding.

Candidates

Nominee

Withdrew during convention

Did not run
Former Associate Justice of the United States Supreme Court Charles Evans Hughes from New York
General of the Armies John J. Pershing from Missouri
26th President of the United States Theodore Roosevelt from New York (died January 6, 1919)

Favorite sons
The following candidates stood for nomination in their home states for the purpose of controlling their delegate slate at the convention. They did not receive the first-ballot support of delegates in more than two other states or territories.

President of Columbia University Nicholas Murray Butler from New York
Governor Calvin Coolidge of Massachusetts
Businessman T. Coleman du Pont of Delaware
Senator Robert M. La Follette of Wisconsin
Judge Jeter Pritchard from North Carolina
Governor William C. Sproul of Pennsylvania
Senator Howard Sutherland of West Virginia
Retired businessman Edward R. Wood from Pennsylvania

Primary campaign
Though he was among the stronger potential candidates, Harding intended from the start to run a low-key campaign that would position himself as the alternative to the chaotic open field left by Roosevelt's death. As he told campaign manager Frank Scobey, "It has been my own judgment not to go at it too vigorously in order to reach the high tide of our publicity movement until late in the campaign. Some enterprises make such a booming start that they fizzle out later on."

There were at least ten serious contenders at the onsent of the campaign: Wood, Harding, Lowden, Coolidge, Hiram Johnson, Howard Sutherland, William Cameron Sproul, Miles Poindexter, Herbert Hoover, and Nicholas Murray Butler. Only Wood, who had the support of major corporations, and Lowden, who acquired a fortune through his marriage to heiress Florence Pullman, were well-funded enough to run a public national campaign; other candidates sought mainly to influence delegate selection behind closed doors or compete in small-state primaries.

Ohio: April 27
One of the key contests came late in April in Harding's home state of Ohio, which he would absolutely need to carry to stand any chance at the nomination. Wood's supporters in the state, led by William C. Procter, surprised Harding by entering the general's name for the primary rather than letting Harding's status as a favorite son go unchallenged. Procter offered to withdraw Wood's name on the condition that he be declared the second choice of the Ohio delegates, but Harding flatly refused.

Wood hit the state with a barnstorming tour, dressed in his military uniform and echoing Roosevelt's progressivism. Harding declined to confront Wood directly, instead delivering speeches on the Republican mantra of "Americanism" as a contrast to internationalist Wilsonian idealism:

"[We must] make sure our own house is in perfect order before we attempt the miracle of Old World stabilization. Call it selfishness or nationality if you will, I think it an inspiration to patriotic devotion: to safeguard America first, to stabilize America first, to prosper America first, to think of America first, to exalt America first to live for and revere America first."

Harding was so confident in winning Ohio that he left the state early to campaign in Indiana. However, the result was a narrow victory over Wood, closer than anyone expected.

Indiana: May 4
The Indiana primary was among the most sharply contested of the campaign, featuring four serious candidates in Wood, Lowden, Harding, and Hiram Johnson. Harding had been convinced to enter the primary by Senator Harry New, one of his closest allies in the Senate.

Harding finished fourth with only nine percent of the vote. Having been humiliated in the only two primaries he contested outside his home state, Harding strongly considered withdrawing to focus on his re-election to the Senate. Instead, his wife convinced him to remain in the race and leverage his status as the Ohio candidate, as others had done before him, and win the nomination on a later ballot. His strategy now focused on becoming the "available man" in the event of a deadlock, securing secondary commitments from delegates who favored Wood, Lowden, or Johnson.

Results

Post-primary maneuvering

Kenyon Committee report
On the eve of the convention, no man had secured enough support for the nomination. However, Wood and Lowden suffered a major blow when the Senate investigation into campaign expenditures was published. The subcommittee chaired by William S. Kenyon revealed massive spending by both Wood and Lowden's campaigns, including two canceled checks from Lowden to Missouri delegates that could not be explained. Johnson was indirectly damaged by the investigation as well, since Wood and Lowden supporters blamed him for instigating it; the enmity between the front-runners appeared to ensure none could secure the others' support.

See also 
 1920 Democratic Party presidential primaries

References

Further reading
 
 
 

 

 

, a campaign biography of Wood